Palpa District is one of five districts of the province Palpa in Peru.

References